Anne Dot Eggers Nielsen (born 6 November 1975) is a Danish former football midfielder and journalist. She most recently played for Brøndby and won over 100 caps for the Danish national team.

After the 2007 FIFA Women's World Cup she and her Danish teammates accused the Chinese hosts of harassment and covert surveillance prior to China's first round match against Denmark. When FIFA refused to investigate Eggers Nielsen publicly related the matter to wider allegations of corrupt practices within FIFA. She retired from international football in January 2008.

After training as a journalist, in 2011 Eggers Nielsen contributed to a biography of former teammate Katrine Pedersen.

References

External links
 
 Profile at Women's United Soccer Association
Danish Football Union (DBU) statistics

1975 births
Living people
Danish women's footballers
Footballers at the 1996 Summer Olympics
Olympic footballers of Denmark
Denmark women's international footballers
1995 FIFA Women's World Cup players
FIFA Century Club
New York Power players
Brøndby IF (women) players
VSK Aarhus (women) players
Women's association football midfielders
2007 FIFA Women's World Cup players
People from Horsens
Sportspeople from the Central Denmark Region
Women's United Soccer Association players